Otchayanny was a  of the Soviet and later Russian navy.

Development and design 

The project began in the late 1960s when it was becoming obvious to the Soviet Navy that naval guns still had an important role particularly in support of amphibious landings, but existing gun cruisers and destroyers were showing their age. A new design was started, employing a new 130 mm automatic gun turret.

Construction and career 
Otchayanny was laid down on 1 March 1977 and launched on 29 March 1980 by Zhdanov Shipyard in Leningrad.  She was commissioned on 30 September 1982.

In October 1991, she was sent to support submarine missile firing and returned to the base in disrepair.

On May 22, 1992, she was put into the reserve of the 2nd category, and a month later (on June 22) was put on medium repair at SRZ-35 (Rosta).

On January 4, 1994, the repair of the ship was discontinued, the ship was included in the 56th Bram and on November 30, 1994, it was towed to Severomorsk.

Since January 30, 1995, she was in the 2nd category reserve, part of the weapons and RTS were removed to repair other ships.

On May 1, 1998, she was transferred to the 43rd division of missile ships of the 7th operative in connection with the reduction of the destroyer brigade. On September 12, 1998, the destroyer was removed from the lists of the Navy, the ship's flag was lowered.

On January 10, 1999, she was docked at SRZ-82 (Roslyakovo) for converting and transfer to ARVI then scrapped in 2003.

Gallery

References 

1980 ships
Ships built at Severnaya Verf
Cold War destroyers of the Soviet Union
Sovremenny-class destroyers